Björn Thomas Andersson Ling, sometimes known as Björn Starrin (born 5 August 1974) is a Swedish actor and bandy player. Ling was a member of the showband The Starboys between 1997 and 2003. For his role as Robin in the film Bröllopsfotografen Ling was nominated for a Guldbagge award in 2010 in the category Best male lead role. Ling has previously played bandy on elite level in the clubs IF Göta Bandy and IF Boltic. Ling has also presented the show Eftersnack on SVT for the local news show. He has previously been seen in films such as Smala Sussie and television shows such as Ack Värmland which is broadcast on TV4.

References

Living people
1974 births
Swedish male actors
People from Karlstad